This is a list of Reform Party MPs. It includes all Members of Parliament that were elected to the House of Commons representing the Reform Party of Canada, between 1987 and 2000.

List of MPs

A 

 Jim Abbott, Kootenay East, 1993–1997; Kootenay—Columbia, 1997–2000
 Diane Ablonczy, Calgary North, 1993–1997; Calgary Nose Hill, 1997–2000
 Rob Anders, Calgary West, 1997–2000

B 

 Roy Bailey, Souris—Moose Mountain, 1997–2000
 Leon Benoit, Vegreville, 1993–1997; Lakeland, 1997–2000
 Cliff Breitkreuz, Yellowhead, 1993–2000
 Garry Breitkreuz, Yorkton—Melville, 1993–2000
 Margaret Bridgman, Surrey North, 1993–1997
 Jan Brown, Calgary Southeast, 1993–1997

C 

 Chuck Cadman, Surrey North, 1997–2000
 Rick Casson, Lethbridge, 1997–2000
 David Chatters, Athabasca, 1993–2000
 John Cummins, Delta, 1993–1997; Delta—South Richmond, 1997–2000

D 

 John Duncan, North Island—Powell River, 1993–1997; Vancouver Island North, 1997–2000

E 

 Reed Elley, Nanaimo—Cowichan, 1997–2000
 Ken Epp, Elk Island, 1993–2000

F 

 Paul Forseth, New Westminster—Burnaby, 1993–1997; New Westminster—Coquitlam—Burnaby, 1997–2000
 Jack Frazer, Saanich—Gulf Islands, 1993–1997

G 

 Bill Gilmour, Comox—Alberni, 1993–1997; Nanaimo—Alberni, 1997–2000
 Peter Goldring, Edmonton East, 1997–2000
 Jim Gouk, Kootenay West—Revelstoke, 1993–1997; Kootenay—Boundary—Okanagan, 1997–2000
 Gurmant Grewal, Surrey Central, 1997–2000
 Deborah Grey, Beaver River, 1989–1997; Edmonton North, 1997–2000
 Herb Grubel, Capilano—Howe Sound, 1993–1997

H 

 Art Hanger, Calgary Northeast, 1993–2000
 Hugh Hanrahan, Edmonton Strathcona, 1993–1997
 Ed Harper, Simcoe Centre, 1993–1997
 Stephen Harper, Calgary West, 1993–1997
 Dick Harris, Prince George—Bulkley Valley, 1993–2000
 Jim Hart, Okanagan—Similkameen—Merritt, 1993–1997; Okanagan—Coquihalla, 1997–2000
 Sharon Hayes, Port Moody—Coquitlam, 1993–1997
 Elwin Hermanson, Kindersley—Lloydminster, 1993–1997
 Grant Hill, Macleod, 1993–2000
 Jay Hill, Prince George—Peace River, 1993–2000
 Howard Hilstrom, Selkirk—Interlake, 1997–2000
 Jake Hoeppner, Portage—Lisgar, 1997–2000

J 

 Rahim Jaffer, Edmonton Strathcona, 1997–2000
 Daphne Jennings. Mission—Coquitlam, 1993–1997
 Dale Johnston, Wetaskiwin, 1993–2000

K 

 Jason Kenney, Calgary Southeast, 1997–2000
 Allan Kerpan, Moose Jaw—Lake Centre, 1993–1997; Blackstrap, 1997–2000
 Derrek Konrad, Prince Albert, 1997–2000

L 

 Eric Lowther, Calgary Centre, 1997–2000
 Gary Lunn, Saanich—Gulf Islands, 1997–2000

M 

 Preston Manning, Calgary Southwest, 1993–2000
 Inky Mark, Dauphin—Swan River, 1997–2000
 Keith Martin, Esquimalt—Juan de Fuca, 1993–2000
 Philip Mayfield, Cariboo—Chilcotin, 1993–2000
 Ian McClelland, Edmonton Southwest, 1993–2000
 Grant McNally, Dewdney—Alouette, 1997–2000
 Val Meredith, Surrey—White Rock—South Langley, 1993–1997; South Surrey—White Rock—Langley, 1997–2000
 Bob Mills, Red Deer, 1993–2000
 Lee Morrison, Swift Current—Maple Creek—Assiniboia, 1993–1997; Cypress Hills—Grasslands, 1997–2000

O 

 Deepak Obhrai, Calgary East, 1997–2000

P 

 Jim Pankiw, Saskatoon—Humboldt, 1997–2000
 Charlie Penson, Peace River, 1993–2000

R 

 Jack Ramsay, Crowfoot, 1993–2000
 John Reynolds, West Vancouver—Sunshine Coast, 1997–2000
 Bob Ringma, Nanaimo—Cowichan, 1993–2000
 Gerry Ritz, Battlefords—Lloydminster, 1997–2000

S 

 Werner Schmidt, Okanagan Centre, 1993–1997; Kelowna, 1997–2000
 Mike Scott, Skeena, 1993–2000
 Jim Silye, Calgary Centre, 1993–1997
 Monte Solberg, Medicine Hat, 1993–2000
 Raymond Speaker, Lethbridge, 1993–1997
 Darrel Stinson, Okanagan—Shuswap, 1993–2000
 Chuck Strahl, Fraser Valley East, 1993–1997; Fraser Valley, 1997–2000

T 

 Myron Thompson, Wild Rose, 1993–2000

V 

 Maurice Vellacott, Wanuskewin, 1997–2000

W 

 Randy White, Fraser Valley West, 1993–1997; Langley—Abbotsford, 1997–2000
 Ted White, North Vancouver, 1993–2000
 John Williams, St. Albert, 1993–2000

See also 

 Category:Reform Party of Canada MPs

Reform Party
Reform Party of Canada politicians